FC Marek is a Bulgarian football club based in Dupnitsa, currently playing in the Third League, the third level of the Bulgarian football league system. It was founded in 1947 following the unification of four local clubs. Home matches take place at Bonchuk Stadium, where Marek famously defeated Bayern Munich in 1977. Bonchuk stadium has a capacity of 16,000. The team last played top-flight football during the 2014–15 season.

Marek's greatest achievement is winning the 1978 Bulgarian Cup.

Honours
 Domestic
First League:
  Third place (2): 1948, 1977

Second League:
  Winners (1): 2014

Bulgarian Cup:
  Winners (1): 1978

History

Early history (1919–1947)
The people of Dupnitsa watched football being played for the first time by foreign troops stationed in the city during World War I. Over the next several years, four clubs were founded in the city: Slavia, Levski, ZHSK, and Athletic. In 1923, these clubs participated in the formation of the Southwest Football League and, between 1935 and 1944, they frequently took part in the finals of the national tournaments. By 1944, each of the four had their own stadium.

Marek (1947–1970)

In 1947, Slavia, Levski, ZHSK, and Athletic decided to merge into one club, which was named Marek, after the nickname of Stanke Dimitrov, a local hero of the Communist party. Marek is an abbreviation for Marxist, Antifascist, Revolutionary, Emigrant, Communist.

In 1948, Marek became a part of the newly created first division, the Bulgarian A PFG, finishing eighth out of ten clubs in season 1948–49. The club was relegated to 2nd division, B PFG, in 1950. Marek subsequently won promotions to the Bulgarian A PFG in 1952 and 1956, followed by immediate relegation to B PFG the following seasons, 1953 and 1957, respectively. During these years, Marek's greatest achievement was 5th place in the Bulgarian A PFG during the 1960–61 season. The team's coach at that time was Lyuben Petrov. Up until the mid-1970s, Marek bounced back and forth between the first and second divisions of Bulgarian football.

Success in Bulgaria and Europe (1975–1981)

The most notable successes for Marek came in the late 1970s and early 1980s when the club finished third in the league in 1977 and won the cup in 1978, defeating overwhelming favorites CSKA Sofia 1:0 in front of 75,000 spectators at the Vasil Levski National Stadium in Sofia.

During the 1976–77 season, Marek defeated CSKA twice, home and away, with the scores 2:1 and 3:1. That season, the club led the league for several rounds and at the end the team fought tooth and nail with Slavia Sofia for the third place in the table. Marek won the decisive game against Slavia in Dupnitsa by the score of 1:0, finishing 3rd and earning an entry into the 1977–78 UEFA Cup. This is Marek's best finish to date in the top flight of Bulgarian football.

In this period the team also played in Europe: UEFA Cup, Cup Winners' Cup, and Intertoto Cup. Victories include games  against Bayern (a 2–0 victory), against Ferencváros of Hungary (a 3–0 victory), and against Aberdeen of Scotland (a 3–2 victory), then led by coach Alex Ferguson. The return leg in Scotland was tied 0–0 until late in the game, when substitute Gordon Strachan scored a goal and led his team to a 3–0 victory.

The club also competed in the 1980 Intertoto Cup against IFK Göteborg (2–3, 1–4) – a team that won the UEFA Cup just a year later;B 93 Copenhagen (2–0, 2–3), and Austria Salzburg (4–2, 2–2) to finish second in the group. The following season Marek once again competed in the Intertoto Cup-against Stuttgarter Kickers (0–1, 0–2), Viking (1–2, 0–3), and Willem II (0–1, 1–4) and finished last in its group.

Stadium and fans:
The team is known for its loyal supporters and the local stadium "Bonchuk Stadium" is infamous for being a difficult place for visiting teams. "Bonchuk Stadium" holds 16,050 people. The town of Dupnitsa was known as the "city on wheels", because thousands of loyal Marek fans would follow the team at away games to remote parts of Bulgaria.

Famous players:
Among the most famous players of Marek are Kiril Milanov, Dimitar Isakov, Nikolay "Shultz" Krastev, Sasho Pargov, Ivan and Ventzi Petrov, Stoyan Stoyanov (a goalkeeper), Asen Tomov, and Dimitre Dimitrov-Miki. The coach associated with the successes of Marek is Yanko Dinkov.

Recent history (2001–2010)

In 1983, Marek was relegated to B PFG and then the third division of Bulgarian football. After over a decade of playing in the lower divisions, in 2001 Marek returned triumphantly to the Bulgarian A PFG.

As a participant in the Intertoto Cup, Marek tied 1–1 the German Bundesliga club VfL Wolfsburg in 2003, but lost away from home the second leg, 0–2, and was eliminated from the tournament. The team finished 7th at the conclusion of the 2003–04 season, 9th at the end of the 2004–05 season, 11th after the 2005–06 season, and 12th at the end of the 2006–07 football season of the Bulgarian premier division, Bulgarian A PFG (out of 16 teams). In 2006–07, Marek secured its place in the Bulgarian top division for the next season with a 1–0 home win over the powerhouse CSKA Sofia.

During the 2007–08 season, Marek was plagued by injuries of key players, several coaching changes and a not-so-well covered conflict between the senior players of the club: Angelo and Yanek Kyuchukov and the club president, Yordan Andreev. Further, the team sold their best and most talented player, Enyo Krastovchev, to Levski Sofia.
As a result, the team finished in last place, 16th, with only 5 wins in 30 games, in the Bulgarian A PFG, and was relegated to B PFG for the 2008–09 season.

Before the start of the 2008–09 season in B PFG, the team held its pre-season training in France in an attempt by the club President Andreev to compile a team made up exclusively of young foreign players. The team even had a Portuguese coach for the first few games of the season. The regular season started disastrously for Marek. After several consecutive losses, the Portuguese coach was fired, and all but one of the foreign players left the club.

Marek barely survived the 2008–09 season in B PFG, finishing 14th out of 16 teams, winning only 7 out of 30 regular season games, scoring 29 and conceding 48 goals.

During the 2009–10 season in B PFG, the team was coached by Velin Kostadinov and player-manager Angelo Kyuchukov. The team found more consistency and finished comfortably in 10th place with 41 points.

A New Beginning (2010–)
The Bulgarian Football Federation denied Marek the license to compete in B Group for the 2010–11 season due to the team's financial debts. Thus, the club had to start over and compete at the lowest level of Bulgarian football, in the regional amateur league, Zona Rila. The team's new coach became Ivaylo Pargov, a former player for the team.

During the 2010–11 season, Marek dominated the local amateur division and after winning all but one of its regular season games, thus earning a playoff game against Belasitsa Petrich for the right to play in the third division, V AFG. The play-off game was tied after 90 minutes, 1–1, and Belasitsa went on to win on penalties.

Despite the lost playoff and the prospect of spending a second season in the regional amateur league, a number of third division teams declined participation prior to the upcoming 2011–12 season due to financial insolvency. Thus, Marek was administratively promoted to the third division, for the 2011–12 season.

During the 2012–13 season, Marek finished first in the Southwest V AFG and earned automatic promotion to the Bulgarian Second Division, B PFG

Marek surprised its numerous fans with a fantastic 2013–14 season in the Second Division, dominating its opponents and securing promotion to A PFG with four games to go, this returning to the top level after a six-year absence.

The return to A PFG proved difficult as Marek finished the 2014–2015 season in 11th place out of 12 teams, and the team was relegated. Marek won only six games the entire season, vs. Haskovo three times, at Cherno More and vs. Slavia Sofia.

After the conclusion of the 2014–2015 season, Marek did not receive a professional license from the Bulgarian Football Federation due to unpaid financial obligations to government institutions, and the team was relegated to the amateur divisions.

Subsequently, Marek was fined by the Bulgarian Football Federation due to "suspicion" of match fixing and the club ownership decided to dissolve the existing club and register a new FC Marek 1915, which started competing from the lowest level of football in Bulgaria, 4th regional division, during the 2015–2016 season.

Following an undefeated season, and navigating through two rounds of playoffs, Marek earned a promotion to the 3rd division for season 2016–17.

After several years in the third division, Marek returned to the Second League for season 2021–2022. Despite a brave effort, Marek did not manage to secure safety in the second level, suffering immediate relegation. The team had a chance to stay in the second tier up until the penultimate round.

Marek in Europe

UEFA cup

Cup Winners' Cup

Intertoto Cup
{|class="wikitable"
|-bgcolor="#efefef"
! Year
! Stage
! Match
! Results
|-
|1980
|align=right|group
|align=left|Marek Dupnitsa –  IFK Göteborg
|align=right|2–3, 1–4
|-
|1980
|align=right|group
|align=left|Marek Dupnitsa –  Austria Salzburg
|align=right|4–2, 2–2
|-
|1980
|align=right|group
|align=left|Marek Dupnitsa –  B 93 Copenhagen
|align=right|2–0, 2–3
|-
|1981
|align=right|group
|align=left|Marek Dupnitsa –  Stuttgarter Kickers
|align=right|0–1, 0–2
|-
|1981
|align=right|group
|align=left|Marek Dupnitsa –  Viking
|align=right|1–2, 0–3
|-
|1981
|align=right|group
|align=left|Marek Dupnitsa –  Willem II
|align=right|0–1, 1–4
|-
|2002
|align=right|1/32
|align=left|Marek Dupnitsa –  Caersws FC
|align=right|2–0, 1–1
|-
|2002
|align=right|1/16
|align=left| FC Ashdod – Marek Dupnitsa
|align=right|1–1, 0–1
|-
|2002
|align=right|1/8
|align=left|Marek Dupnitsa –  Slaven Belupo
|align=right|0–3, 1–3
|-
|2003
|align=right|1/32
|align=left| Videoton – Marek Dupnitsa
|align=right|2–2, 1–1
|-
|2003
|align=right|1/16
|align=left|Marek Dupnitsa –  VfL Wolfsburg
|align=right|1–1, 0–2
|-
|2004
|align=right| 1/32
|align=left|Marek Dupnitsa –  FC Dila Gori
|align=right|0–0, 2–0
|-
|2004
|align=right|1/16
|align=left| Genk – Marek Dupnitsa
|align=right|2–1, 0–0
|-
|}

League positions

Current squad
As of 2 November 2021

Notable players
The following players included were either playing for their respective national teams or left good impression among the fans.

Note: For a list of other Marek Dupnitsa players, see :Category:PFC Marek Dupnitsa players.

References

Marek
Marek
 
1915 establishments in Bulgaria